The 2012 Super League Grand Final was the 15th official Grand Final and conclusive and championship-deciding match of the Super League XVII season. The match was held on Saturday 6 October 2012, at Old Trafford, Manchester, and was contested by English clubs Leeds Rhinos and Warrington Wolves. The 2012 Grand Final was a repeat of the 2012 Challenge Cup Final, in which Warrington beat Leeds 35-18 at Wembley Stadium, although it was Leeds who would win the Super League Grand Final, winning 26-18.

The progress of the two teams competing in the match were decided by results in the Super League XVII play-offs.

Background

Route to the Final

Leeds Rhinos
As in 2011, Leeds Rhinos finished the regular season in 5th place, meaning the team started their play-off campaign in the elimination play-off, where they met West Yorkshire rivals Wakefield Trinity Wildcats, playing in their first play-off campaign at Headingley Carnegie Stadium. Leeds won the game 42-20 with Ben Jones-Bishop scoring a hat-trick and Danny McGuire becoming the all-time leading try-scorer in the Super League history.

In the Preliminary Semi Final, Leeds would meet the lowest-placed loser from the Qualification play-off games, Catalans Dragons in the south of France, who they would beat 27-20, thanks to five goals from Kevin Sinfield and a drop goal from McGuire. That result booked Leeds' place in the Qualifying Semi-Final and the club call. Wigan Warriors were the team that were given the decision and chose Leeds. The match at the DW Stadium was won 13-12 by Leeds, despite Wigan scoring more tries (two to Leeds' one). Leeds reached the Grand Final, thanks to the boot of Kevin Sinfield, who kicked four goals, including the conversion to Kallum Watkins' try, and a first-half drop goal.

Warrington Wolves
Warrington's 2012 play-off campaign did not get off to a good start, as they lost 28-6 to St. Helens, despite having home advantage in the Qualifying play-off game following their 2nd place league finish. Tommy Makinson was Saints's most influential player in the game, scoring 16 points from two tries and kicking four goals.

The defeat meant Warrington would have to compete in the Preliminary Semi-Final round but would once again play at home at the Halliwell Jones Stadium, this time against Hull FC. Warrington would race into a 24-point lead before winning the 24-12 to reach the Preliminary Semi Final. Following Wigan's club call decision, Warrington were re-united against St Helens, this time at Langtree Park. The reverse of the fixture also meant a reverse of luck for Warrington, who would gain revenge for the defeat earlier in the play-offs by winning 36-18 to reach their ever Grand Final. It also sees coach Tony Smith become the first coach to reach the Super Grand Final with two different clubs, the other club being Warrington's opponent, Leeds Rhinos.

Match details

References

External links
Super League Play-offs website

Super League Grand Finals
Warrington Wolves matches
Leeds Rhinos matches
Grand Final
Super League Grand Final